Jatav, also known as Jatava/Jatan/  Jatua/Jhusia /Jatia/Jatiya, is an Indian social group that are considered to be a subcaste of the Kshatriya Chamar caste, who are classified as a Scheduled Caste under modern India's system of positive discrimination.

According to the 2011 Census of India, the Jatav community of Uttar Pradesh comprised 54% of that state's total 22,496,047 Scheduled Caste population.

History
Some Jatav authors have disputed being Scheduled. In the 1920s, Jatavs claimed to be survivors of the ancient war between Parashuram, the legend of the Brahmins, and Kshatriyas, forced into hiding. Their proof of ancestry is a series of correspondences or status similarities between Jatav and other Kshatriya clans. According to Owen Lynch, "These included identical gotras, and such Kshatriya-like ceremonies as shooting a cannon at weddings and the use of the bow and arrow at the birth saṃskāra".
According to M. P. S. Chandel 
In the early part of the 20th century, the Jatavs attempted the process of sanskritisation, claiming themselves to be historical of the Kshatriya varna. They gained political expertise by forming associations and by developing a literate cadre of leaders, and they tried to change their position in the caste system through the emulation of upper-caste behavior. As a part of this process, they also claimed not to be Chamars and petitioned the government of the British Raj to be officially classified differently: disassociating themselves from the Chamar community would they felt, enhance their acceptance as Kshatriya. These claims were not accepted by other castes and, although the government was amenable, no official reclassification as a separate community occurred due to the onset of World War II.
An organisation of young Jatavs, called the Jatav Vir, was formed in Agra in 1917, and a Jatav Pracharak Sangh was organised in 1924. They joined with local Banias to establish a front and thus one of them won the seat of the mayor in Agra, and another became a member of the Legislative Council.

Under the leadership of Jatav Mahasabha in the 1931 census, he took an aggressive stand for his demand to include Jatavs in the Kshatriya class and to rename them as 'Jatav' from Chanwar Chamar.  They were successful and in the new census of India the Tanners were called 'Jatav'.

Earlier pressing for the Kshatriya status, the new issues emerged among Jatavs in 1944–45. The Jatavs formed the Scheduled Caste Federation of Agra having ties with the Ambedkar-led All India Scheduled Caste Federation. They started recognizing themselves as Scheduled Caste and hence "Dalit". This acceptance is attributed to the protections available to the scheduled castes.

According to Owen Lynch:

Religion
Most of the Jatavs belongs to the Hindu ,Some Jatavs also became Buddhists in 1956, after B. R. Ambedkar converted him to Buddhism, in 1990 many more converted to Buddhism. Ravidassia follow the cult as ideal.

status in the states  
Jatavs are often combined with Chamar, Ahirwar, Ravidassia and other subcastes and are given Scheduled Caste in major North Indian states under India's positive reservation system.

Notable Jatavs
Chetram Jatav -was a freedom fighter who participated in the Indian Rebellion of 1857
 Mayawati -is an Indian politician. She has served four separate terms as Chief Minister of Uttar Pradesh.
 Meira Kumar-is an Indian politician and former diplomat.
 Baby Rani Maurya-is an Indian politician, currently serving as a minister in the Government of Uttar Pradesh since March 2022.
Asim Arun-is an Indian politician and resigned 1994 Batch Indian Police Service officer. Arun is the member of Uttar Pradesh Legislative Assembly from Kannauj Sadar since March 2022.
 Ram Ji Lal Suman-is an Indian politician
Chandrashekhar Azad Ravan- is an Indian politician

See also
Jatav Mahasabha
Ravidassia
Mochi
Chamar
Chamar Regiment

References

Sources 

 
 
 
 

Dalit communities
Hindu communities
Ethnic groups in India
Ethnic groups in Nepal
Scheduled Castes of Delhi
Scheduled Castes of Bihar
Scheduled Castes of West Bengal
Scheduled Castes of Uttar Pradesh
Scheduled Castes of Uttarakhand
Scheduled Castes of Andhra Pradesh
Scheduled Castes of Chhattisgarh
Scheduled Castes of Madhya Pradesh
Scheduled Castes of Haryana
Scheduled Castes of Rajasthan
Scheduled Castes of Gujarat